The Philosophy of 'As if': A System of the Theoretical, Practical and Religious Fictions of Mankind is a 1911 book by the German philosopher Hans Vaihinger, based on his dissertation of 1877. The work for which Vaihinger is best known, it was published in an English translation by C. K. Ogden in 1924. In 1935, a revised and abbreviated English translation by Ogden was published. The revised translation was based on the sixth German edition of the original work.

Summary
Vaihinger begins with an autobiography, discussing the origins of his philosophical ideas. He writes that he chose the title The Philosophy of 'As If because "it seemed to me to express more convincingly than any other possible title" his view that, "appearance, the consciously-false, plays an enormous part in science, in world-philosophies and in life."<ref>Vaihinger, Hans (1968). The Philosophy of 'As If'''. Fakenham: Cox & Wyman, Ltd. pp. xxiii-xlviii.</ref>

The book presents an epistemology as well as a practical world and life view. Vaihinger describes human knowledge as erroneous and contradictory and asks how to explain the fact that one can still arrive at the right thing based on these false assumptions. Vaihinger's answer is that the assumptions are a practically useful fiction, and that knowledge can therefore only be pragmatically substantiated by the success that is achieved in its application. Religious and metaphysical views, like logic, are not true in an objective sense, since this cannot be established. Instead, the question had to be asked whether it was useful to act "as if" they were true.

ReceptionThe Philosophy of 'As if' influenced both Sigmund Freud since his 1913 letter to Sándor Ferenczi, and Alfred Adler in his 1912 book Über den nervösen Charakter. Grundzüge einer vergleichenden Individualpsychologie und Psychotherapie (English translation: The Neurotic Constitution. Outlines of a Comparative Individualistic Psychology and Psychotherapy''). Though it contained the first use of the term "logical positivism", the logical positivists were generally dismissive of the work. The philosopher Moritz Schlick wrote that Vaihinger's description of his philosophy as a form of "idealist positivism" was one of its many contradictions.

The American journalist H. L. Mencken was scathing in his criticism of the book, which he dismissed as an unimportant "foot-note to all existing systems". Michael J. Inwood writes that Vaihinger's theory "involves familiar, though not necessarily insurmountable, difficulties". He finds it open to criticism on the grounds that it involves a covert appeal to a non-pragmatic concept of truth. He also notes that the theory implies that claims about the utility of holding doctrines and even the theory itself are no more than useful fictions.

In his biography, Philosopher at Large, Mortimer J. Adler notes that this book was one of his influences on his first book, Dialectic.

See also
 Fictionalism

References

External links
 Die Philosophie des Als Ob 7th, 8th ed. in German (1922), at archive.org

1911 non-fiction books
Books by Hans Vaihinger
Contemporary philosophical literature
Epistemology literature
German non-fiction books
Philosophy of religion literature